Rere-ō-maki  (died 1868) was a New Zealand tribal leader. Of Māori descent, she identified with the Te Āti Haunui-a-Pāpārangi iwi. She was born along the Whanganui River in New Zealand. She was the sister of Te Anaua, a leader of Ngāti Ruaka, a subtribe of Te Āti Haunui-a-Pāpārangi. She was the mother of military leader Te Keepa Te Rangihiwinui, also known as Major Kemp.

Rere-ō-maki is one of the few known women to have signed the Treaty of Waitangi, she did so on 23 May 1840 in Whanganui.

References

Year of birth unknown
1868 deaths
Te Āti Haunui-a-Pāpārangi people
Signatories of the Treaty of Waitangi